The 2013 All-Australian team represents the best performed Australian Football League (AFL) players during the 2013 season. It was announced on 16 September as a complete Australian rules football team of 22 players. The team is honorary and does not play any games.

Selection panel
The selection panel for the 2013 All-Australian team consisted of chairman Andrew Demetriou, Mark Evans, Kevin Bartlett, Luke Darcy, Danny Frawley, Glen Jakovich, Mark Ricciuto and Cameron Ling.

Team

Initial squad
At the conclusion of the 2013 AFL home and away season, a provisional squad of 40 players was chosen.

Final team
 had the most selections, with four players. Geelong captain Joel Selwood was announced as the All-Australian captain and  star Gary Ablett Jr. was announced as vice-captain.

Note: the position of coach in the All-Australian team is traditionally awarded to the coach of the premiership team.

References

All-Australian team
All-Australian Team